The Ho-301 was a Japanese 40 millimeter caliber autocannon that saw limited use during World War II, on Japanese Army Nakajima Ki-44 and Kawasaki Ki-45 KAI aircraft. It was unusual in using caseless ammunition. Although the effective range of the cannon was only 150 meters (490 ft), the Ho-301 was light and rapid-firing for its caliber.

The caseless design revolved around a specially designed projectile, that was in effect a small rocket. The round used an internal propellant chamber at the rear of the projectile containing a ten gram silk bag filled with smokeless powder. Drilled into the base plate of the round are twelve 3.8 millimeter diameter exhaust holes. The propellant chamber is sealed by a thin aluminum sealing cup, which covers the exhaust holes. When the primer is struck, the bag of propellant ignites, and the pressure rises until the aluminum cup bursts, allowing the exhaust gas to rush through the exhaust holes pushing the projectile forward. The propellant was exhausted before the projectile left the barrel.

Because of the low muzzle velocity (245 meters/second or about 804 ft/sec - equivalent to a moderately powerful air rifle) the weapon was only suited to attacking bombers; even here the extremely low muzzle velocity made it difficult to achieve hits from any position besides directly astern the target aircraft and well within the range of defensive counterfire.

The modern Russian VOG grenades fired by the GP-25 grenade-launcher use a similar principle.

Ammunition specifications 
 Length of projectile (fuzed): 129 mm
 Diameter of rotating band: 41 mm
 Diameter of body: 39 mm
 Wall thickness: 4 mm - 5 mm
 Weight: 0.590 kg
 Explosive content: 0.065 kg approx 
 Fuze: Direct acting impact fuze

See also 
 MK 108 cannon
 High-Low System

References
 
 

40 mm artillery
Aircraft guns
Autocannon
Machine guns of Japan
Caseless firearms
Military equipment introduced from 1940 to 1944